Hiala or Hayala is a village in Shaheed Bhagat Singh Nagar district of Punjab State, India. The village is administrated by Sarpanch an elected representative of the village.

Demography 
As of 2011, Hiala has a total number of 326 houses and population of 1477 of which 776 include are males while 701 are females according to the report published by Census India in 2011. The literacy rate of Hiala is 77.34%, higher than the state average of 75.84%. The population of children under the age of 6 years is 109 which is 7.38% of total population of Hiala, and child sex ratio is approximately 817 as compared to Punjab state average of 846.

Most of the people are from Schedule Caste which constitutes 27.62% of total population in Hiala. The town does not have any Schedule Tribe population so far.

As per the report published by Census India in 2011, 510 people were engaged in work activities out of the total population of Hiala which includes 484 males and 26 females. According to census survey report 2011, 83.92% workers describe their work as main work and 16.08% workers are involved in Marginal activity providing livelihood for less than 6 months.

Education 
The village has a Punjabi medium, co-ed upper primary with secondary/higher secondary school founded in 1950. The schools provide mid-day meal as per Indian Midday Meal Scheme. The school provide free education to children between the ages of 6 and 14 as per Right of Children to Free and Compulsory Education Act. KC Engineering College and Doaba Khalsa Trust Group Of Institutions are the nearest colleges.

Landmarks and history 
The village has a Sikh shrine Gurudwara Bhai Sikh which situated on the west entrance of the village. The Gurudwara is built at the place which used to be the residence of Baba Bhai Sikh who was a native of Jhingran and later started living in Hiala, He used to give spiritual discourse to the people. A religious fair held at the Gurdwara on and a day after Dushera and other occasions, which attended by people of all religions.

Singh Sabha Gurudwara, Shaheedan Da Gurudwara Sahib and Jai Maa Chintapurni Temple are other are religious sites in and around Hiala.

Transport 
Nawanshahr railway station is the nearest train station.

See also 
List of villages in India

References

External links 
 Tourism of Punjab
 Census of Punjab
 Locality Based PINCode

Villages in Shaheed Bhagat Singh Nagar district